Trelldom is a Norwegian black metal band, formed in 1992.

Line-up
Gaahl - Vocals (also in Wardruna, Gaahlskagg, Sigfader, God Seed)
Sir - Bass (also in God Seed)
Valgard -Guitar

Discography
1995 Til Evighet…, Head Not Found  
1998 Til et Annet…, Hammerheart Records
2007 Til Minne…, Regain Records

External links
Trelldom
Trelldom | Listen and Stream Free Music, Albums, New Releases, Photos, Videos

Norwegian black metal musical groups
Musical groups established in 1992
1992 establishments in Norway
Musical groups from Sogn og Fjordane